Brendan Moore (born 17 February 1972) is a professional snooker referee from Sheffield, England. Moore first refereed on the World Snooker Tour in 2005. Moore took charge of two World Snooker Championship finals: the 2014 World Snooker Championship and the 2018 World Snooker Championship. He was also the referee in the 2010 and 2013 UK Championship finals, as well as the 2012 and 2020 Masters finals. Moore has been in charge of nine tournament matches that have contained maximum breaks.

References

1972 births
Living people
Snooker referees and officials
Sportspeople from Sheffield
English referees and umpires